Garry "Gaz" Jennings is an English musician best known for his work as the guitarist for doom metal band Cathedral. In addition, he has also worked as the guitarist of thrash metal band Acid Reign, punk rock band Septic Tank and heavy metal bands Lucifer and Death Penalty.

Biography
Jennings formed Acid Reign in 1985, along with Howard "H" Smith, Kevin "Kev" Papworth, Ian Gangwer and Mark Ramsey Wharton, while attending Harrogate High School (then-called "Granby"). After recording their debut EP, Jennings departed from the band in 1988, being replaced by Adam Lehan. Then in 1989, Jennings was contacted by ex-Napalm Death vocalist Lee Dorian with the proposition of forming a band together, which would end up becoming Cathedral, and would also include then-Acid Reign guitarist Adam Lehan. In 1994, Jennings would briefly form a band called Septic Tank with Lee Dorrian, Repulsion vocalist and bassist Scott Carlson and Trouble drummer Barry Stern. Cathedral would announce their breakup shortly after the release of their 2013 album The Last Spire, leading to Jennings reforming Septic Tank, this time with Jaime "Gomez" Arellano, due to Barry Stern's death in 2005. In 2014, Jennings released the self-titled album for a band he formed in 2010 called "Death Penalty". Jennings would also form a band called Lucifer with Andy Prestidge of Angel Witch and Johanna Sadonis, formerly of the Oath; however, Jennings would later depart from the band, being replaced by ex-Entombed drummer Nicke Andersson.

Discography

With Acid Reign
Moshkinstein (1988)

With Cathedral
Studio albums
Forest of Equilibrium (1991)
The Ethereal Mirror (1993)
The Carnival Bizarre (1995)
Supernatural Birth Machine (1996)
Caravan Beyond Redemption (1998)
Endtyme (2001)
The VIIth Coming (2002)
The Garden of Unearthly Delights (2005)
The Guessing Game (2010)
The Last Spire (2013)

EPs
In Memorium (1990)
Statik Majik (1994)
Cosmic Requiem (1994)

With Septic Tank
Studio albums
Rotting Civilisation (2018)

EPs
Septic Tank (2013)

With Death Penalty
Death Penalty (2014)

With Lucifer
Lucifer I (2015)

References

Living people
English bass guitarists
Male bass guitarists
English heavy metal guitarists
English male guitarists
Hardcore punk musicians
Thrash metal musicians
Cathedral (band) members
Septic Tank (band) members
Acid Reign members
Year of birth missing (living people)